Union commonly refers to:

 Trade union, an organization of workers 
 Union (set theory), in mathematics, a fundamental operation on sets

Union may also refer to:

Arts and entertainment

Music  
 Union (band), an American rock group 
 Union (Union album), 1998
 Union (Chara album), 2007
 Union (Toni Childs album), 1988
 Union (Cuff the Duke album), 2012
 Union (Paradoxical Frog album), 2011
 Union, a 2001 album by Puya
 Union, a 2001 album by Rasa
 Union (The Boxer Rebellion album), 2009
 Union (Yes album), 1991
 "Union" (Black Eyed Peas song), 2005

Other uses in arts and entertainment
 Union (Star Wars), a Dark Horse comics limited series
 Union, in the fictional Alliance–Union universe of C. J. Cherryh
 Union (Horse with Two Discs), a bronze sculpture by Christopher Le Brun, 1999–2000
 The Union (Marvel Team), a Marvel Comics superhero team and comic series

Education
 Union Academy (disambiguation), the name of several institutions
 Union College (disambiguation), the name of several institutions
 Union Institute & University, in Ohio, U.S.
 Union Presbyterian Seminary, in Virginia, U.S.
 Union Public Schools, a school district in Oklahoma, U.S.
 Union School of Theology, in Wales
 Union Theological College, in Northern Ireland
 Union Theological Seminary (disambiguation), the name of several institutions
 Union University (disambiguation), the name of several institutions

History and politics 

 Economic union, a type of trade bloc
 Political union, a type of state which is composed of or created out of smaller states
 Personal union, the combination of two or more states that have the same monarch
 Poor law union, a former unit of local government in the United Kingdom
 Real union, a union of two or more states, which share some state institutions
 CDU/CSU, or the Union, a German political alliance
 Union (American Civil War), U.S. states that were loyal to the U.S. federal government
 Union (Hungarian-German trade union council)
 Union (Madagascar), a political party

Places

Canada
 Union, Elgin County, Ontario
 Union, Leeds and Grenville United Counties, Ontario
 Union, Nova Scotia
 Union, Prince Edward Island

United States

 Union, Alabama
 Union, Connecticut
 Union, Illinois
 Union, Logan County, Illinois
 Union, Indiana
 Union, Iowa
 Union, Kentucky
 Union, Louisiana
 Union Parish, Louisiana
 Union, Maine
 Union, Mississippi
 Union, Missouri, in Franklin County
 Union, Clark County, Missouri
 Union, Nebraska
 Union, New Hampshire
 Union (hamlet), New York, in Madison County
 Union, New York, in Broome County
 Union, Ohio, a city in Montgomery and Miami Counties
 Union, Oregon
 Union, Pennsylvania (disambiguation)
 Union, South Carolina
 Union, Texas
 Union, Virginia
 Union, Washington
 Union, West Virginia
 Union, Barbour County, West Virginia
 Union, Wisconsin (disambiguation)
 Arcata, California, first settled as Union
 Mount Union (Arizona)

Elsewhere
 Union, Grenada
 Unión, Paraguay
 Union, Bohol, Philippines
 Union, Dapa, Philippines
 Union Island, Saint Vincent and the Grenadines

Science and mathematics
 Union (set theory), in mathematics, a fundamental operation on sets
 Union (SQL), an set operation
 Union type, in computer science, a type of data structure

Sports
 1. FC Union Berlin, a German association football club
 Chicago Unions, a professional, Black baseball team that played in the US in the late 19th century, prior to the formation of the Negro leagues. 
 Chicago Union Giants, a former American baseball team in the Negro leagues 
 Philadelphia Union, a soccer team
 Royale Union Saint-Gilloise, a Belgian association football club
 Union Race Course, formerly in San Francisco, U.S.

Other uses
 Union (automobile), made by the Union Automobile Company 1902–1905
 Union (plumbing), a pipe fitting
 Union (United States coin), a proposed $100 coin
 List of ships named Union
 Gabrielle Union (born 1972), an American actress

See also

 
 
 Union Bank (disambiguation)
 The Union (disambiguation)
 Reunion (disambiguation)
 European Union
 Government of India, the union government created by the constitution of India
 Dominion of India, or Union of India, an independent dominion in the Commonwealth 1947–1950
 Marriage, a culturally recognised union between people
 Soyuz ('Union'), an internal abbreviation for the Union of Soviet Socialist Republics
 Students' union
 Union State, of Russia and Belarus
 United Kingdom
 United States
Civil union